John Able Haas (January 9, 1909 – July 5, 1992) was an American sprint canoer who competed in the 1950s. Competing in two Summer Olympics, he earned his best finish of fifth in the C-2 10000 m event at Helsinki in 1952.

References
Sports-reference.com profile

1909 births
1992 deaths
American male canoeists
Canoeists at the 1952 Summer Olympics
Canoeists at the 1956 Summer Olympics
Olympic canoeists of the United States